netd is a video on demand web site launched in Turkey on 11 January 2013. Netd is owned by Doğan Media Group and offers TV series mostly broadcast on Kanal D, a Doğan Holding channel. As of January 2013, popular TV series like Kuzey Güney, Yalan Dünya, Leyla ile Mecnun, Seksenler, and Öyle Bir Geçer Zaman Ki can be watched online, as well as old popular TV series like Aşk-ı Memnu, Kavak Yelleri and Fatmagül'ün Suçu Ne?. The web site also offers monthly free movies window, Kids Section, TV shows and 6 live broadcasts.

On 24 March 2014, NETD launched its music service with a motto of "Türkçe Müzikte İlk Durak - First Stop For Turkish Music".

All the content is free and ad-supported, there is no paid version. Videos are in up to 720p HD quality, live broadcasting and some content is in SD.

Competitors 
The web site launched about one month after Tvyo, a similar service by Doğuş Media Group. Previously, Apple iTunes Store opened for Turkey on 4 December 2012 only for music and films. TTNET also has a similar subscription-based service, Tivibu.

netd specials 
netd offers netd.com only shows such as:
 Kaybedenler Kulübü 
 Kronos - Mini Serials
 Seksi Sorun
 Ask Para Kariyer
 Evden Uzakta - Music
 Ömür Törpüsü
 Sisenin Dibi
 Sosyal Kafa
 Dehsetin Taniklari
 Sokak Röportajları
 Yan Masa
 Kafa Jello ReklamD

netd live channels 
NETD has 9 live channels. Kanal D, CNN Turk, Dream TV, Dream Turk, TV2, Tay TV, DShopping, NetD Live. NETD also started broadcasting Disney Channel Turkey in mid of October 2013.  
NETD also broadcasts live programs during the day such as Sosyal Kafa (Social media review program), Ask Para Kariyer (Astrology and Angel Cards), and Kaybedenler Kulübü (Live Radio Program).

References

External links

Turkish companies established in 2013
Turkish entertainment websites
Turkish-language websites
Internet properties established in 2013
Video on demand services